Gangshang may refer to the following locations in China:

 Gangshang, Hebei (岗上镇), town in Gaocheng
 Gangshang, Jiangxi (冈上镇), town in Nanchang County
 Gangshang, Shandong (港上镇), town in Tancheng County